Arzil (also Romanized as Arzīl) is a village in Arzil Rural District, Kharvana District, Varzaqan County, East Azerbaijan Province, Iran. At the 2006 census, its population was 432, in 125 families.

References 

Towns and villages in Varzaqan County